Catonism refers to a repressive social order that supports those in power and opposes reforms and development, particularly those that would benefit the peasantry. It is based on the romantic political view that gives more weight to the organic and whole nature of peasant culture.

Origin 
Barrington Moore introduced Catonism in his book Social Origins of Dictatorship and Democracy as the "advocacy of the sterner virtues, militarism, contempt for 'decadent' foreigners and anti-intellectualism".
Moore coined the word "Catonism" with a nod towards Cato the Elder (234-149 BCE). He characterized the Catonist attitude as the reaction from rural aristocracy towards rapid political and economic changes.

Beliefs

The social order has three core beliefs. The first is the notion that liberty is the highest good and that sacrifices made for its achievement is a worthy pursuit. The second is the belief that service to one's country constitutes an individual's most important calling. Finally, it holds that the proper outlook towards power must be anchored on vigilance since authority can be utilized to achieve a specific purpose or advance an interest. Moreover, policies are not supported to obtain happiness or wealth but to contribute to a way of life that proved valid in the past.

See also
 Fascism

References

Anti-intellectualism
Militarism
Political philosophy